Kenneth Rosén (16 September 1951 – 27 December 2004) was a Swedish football goalkeeper and later manager.

He was born in Sundsvall and started his playing career in Skellefteå. He also played for Örebro SK.

He started his manager career in 1977 in Laxå IF. He then managed seven Swedish clubs as well as Faroese B68 Toftir before moving to Norway. After two season each in Raufoss and Skjetten he was hired as Bryne's manager ahead of the 1997 season. He guided the team to the 2000 Eliteserien.

Ahead of the 2001 season he was hired as director of sports in Vålerenga, but he was sacked already in June 2001. He took over as manager of L/F Hønefoss, but ahead of the 2002 season he was hired as manager of Kongsvinger. His final club was Gefle, where he died after two seasons as manager and leading the team from 2004 Superettan to 2005 Allsvenskan. He died of cancer at the hospital in Gävle.

References

1951 births
2004 deaths
People from Skellefteå Municipality
Swedish footballers
Skellefteå FF players
Örebro SK players
Association football goalkeepers
Swedish football managers
Örebro SK managers
IK Brage managers
Halmstads BK managers
B68 Toftir
Raufoss IL managers
Bryne FK managers
Vålerenga Fotball non-playing staff
Hønefoss BK managers
Kongsvinger IL Toppfotball managers
Gefle IF managers
Allsvenskan managers
Superettan managers
Eliteserien managers
Swedish expatriate football managers
Expatriate football managers in the Faroe Islands
Swedish expatriate sportspeople in the Faroe Islands
Expatriate football managers in Norway
Swedish expatriate sportspeople in Norway
Deaths from cancer in Sweden
Sportspeople from Västerbotten County